Yahumara Neyra Bens (born 18 April 1976) is a retired Cuban athlete who specialised in the 100 metres hurdles. She won several medals on regional level.

She has personal bests of 12.75 seconds in the 100 metres hurdles (Réthimno 2002) and 7.98 seconds in the 60 metres hurdles (Sindelfingen 2001).

Competition record

References

1976 births
Living people
Cuban female hurdlers
Athletes (track and field) at the 1999 Pan American Games
Athletes (track and field) at the 2003 Pan American Games
Pan American Games competitors for Cuba
World Athletics Championships athletes for Cuba
20th-century Cuban women
21st-century Cuban women